Alesia Turava (born 6 December 1979) is a Belarusian middle-distance runner. She is a former world record holder in 3000 metre steeplechase with 9:16.51 minutes, achieved in Gdansk on 27 July 2002. Still, Turava mostly competes over 1500 metres. Her sister, Ryta Turava, also competes in the sport of athletics (20 km race walk).

Biography
She won the gold medal in the inaugural 3000 m steeplechase for women held at the 2006 European Athletics Championships in Gothenburg. Her sister Ryta Turava is a successful race walker.

Achievements

Personal bests
1500 metres - 3:59.89 min (2002)
3000 metres - 8:32.89 min (2001)
5000 metres - 15:23.84 min (2000)
3000 metre steeplechase - 9:16.51 min (2002)

External links

1979 births
Living people
Belarusian female steeplechase runners
Belarusian female middle-distance runners
World record setters in athletics (track and field)
European Athletics Championships medalists